The 2009 Canadian Olympic Curling Trials were held December 6–13, 2009 at Rexall Place in Edmonton. The event is also known and advertised as Roar of the Rings. The winner of the men's and women's events represented Canada at the 2010 Winter Olympics. Canada was guaranteed a team in each event as hosts.

Canadian Olympic qualification process

For both men's and women's categories, a pool of sixteen teams is designated as eligible to be Canada's representative at the 2010 Olympics. From the pool of sixteen, four teams are selected to qualify directly for the 2009 Canadian Curling Trials, "The 2009 Roar of the Rings". The remaining twelve teams compete in a pre-trials tournament, which is a triple-knockout bonspiel, with four teams advancing to the eight-team trials. The winner of the trials represents Canada at the 2010 Olympics.

Pool of sixteen

For each of the three curling seasons from 2006–07 to 2008–09, four teams are named to the pool of sixteen, resulting in a total of twelve teams in the pool by the end of the 2008–09 season. The four teams are the following:
 winner of the Canadian Men's/Women's Curling Championships
 winner of the Canada Cup tournament
 winner of the Players' Championships
 leader in the Canadian Team Ranking System for that season
If a team qualifies under more than one criterion (for example, a team wins both the Canada Cup and is the leader in the CTRS standings) or has already qualified in a previous season, then the four spots for that season are rounded out by selecting the highest ranked teams in the season's CTRS standings that have not already qualified.

To select the remaining four teams for the pool of sixteen, after the 2008–2009 season, from the teams that have not already qualified, the highest ranked teams are chosen, based on three-season, two-season, and one-season rankings. The rankings are determined by adding up the CTRS points earned by each team in their best events in each season.

If a team's membership changes from one season to another, the CTRS points earned by the team are divided amongst the individual players and allocated to their new teams.

Direct qualifiers to the Olympic Trials
From the pool of sixteen, the first four teams who meet any one of the following criteria (in order of priority) will be qualified directly for the Canadian Olympic Trials.
 team leads the CTRS standings in two of the three curling seasons from 2006–07 to 2008–09
 team wins three of the following events in the seasons from 2006–07 to 2008–09:
 Canada Cup tournament
 Players' Championships
 Canadian Men's/Women's Curling Championships
 World Curling Championships
 team not yet qualified for the Olympic Trials with the highest CTRS point total from 2006–07 to 2008–09, using the same formula used to qualify teams to the pool of sixteen
 team not yet qualified for the Olympic Trials with the highest CTRS point total from 2007–08 to 2008–09, using the same formula used to qualify teams to the pool of sixteen

Pre-trials qualifier
The pre-trials tournament was held on November 10–15, 2009 at the CN Centre in Prince George, British Columbia. The twelve teams from the pool of sixteen that did not qualify directly for the Olympic trials participated in a triple-knockout competition that selected four additional teams to compete in the Olympic Trials.

Qualified teams

Men's

Women's

Men's Tournament Brackets

A Event

B Event

C Event

Women's Tournament Brackets

A Event

B Event

C Event

Olympic Trials

Qualified teams

Men's

Women's

Men's tournament

Standings

Draw 1
December 6, 6:00pm

Draw 2
December 7, 1:00pm

Draw 3
December 8, 8:30am

Draw 4
December 8, 6:00pm

Draw 5
December 9, 1:00pm

Draw 6
December 10, 8:30am

Draw 7
December 10, 6:00pm

Semifinal
December 12, 1:00pm

Final
December 13, 1:00pm

Women's tournament

Standings

Draw 1
December 6, 1:00pm

Draw 2
December 7, 8:30am

Draw 3
December 7, 6:00pm

Draw 4
December 8, 1:00pm

Draw 5
December 9, 8:30am

Draw 6
December 9, 7:30pm

Draw 7
December 10, 1:00pm

Tiebreaker 1
December 11, 8:30am

Tiebreaker 2
December 11, 1:00pm

Semifinal
December 11, 6:00pm

Final
December 12, 6:00pm

References

External links
Draw Schedule

See also

2010 Winter Olympics
Qualification for the 2010 Winter Olympics
Curling at the 2010 Winter Olympics
Olympic Curling Trials, 2009
Canadian Olympic Curling Trials
Curling competitions in Edmonton
2009 in Alberta
December 2009 sports events in Canada